Turnin' Back the Pages is a compilation album released by Stephen Stills from his years with Columbia Records (1975-1978) and the Super Session album (1968).  It was released in 2003.

Track listing

Stephen Stills compilation albums
2003 compilation albums